Cactoblastis is a genus of snout moths. It was described by Émile Louis Ragonot in 1901 and is known from Argentina, Peru, and Brazil.

Species
 Cactoblastis bucyrus Dyar, 1922
 Cactoblastis cactorum (Berg, 1885) – South American cactus moth
 Cactoblastis doddi Heinrich, 1939
 Cactoblastis mundelli Heinrich, 1939
 Cactoblastis ronnai (Brèthes, 1920)

References

Phycitini
Pyralidae genera
Taxa named by Émile Louis Ragonot